New Gairloch, is a community in the Canadian province of Nova Scotia, located  in Pictou County. It was named for Gairloch in Scotland.

References

External links
New Gairloch on Destination Nova Scotia

Communities in Pictou County
General Service Areas in Nova Scotia